Dark Matter Moving at the Speed of Light is a 2004 album by Afrika Bambaataa, released on Tommy Boy Entertainment.

Track listing

References

External links
Info found at CD Universe

2004 albums
Afrika Bambaataa albums
Tommy Boy Records albums